The Verdigris River  is a tributary of the Arkansas River in southeastern Kansas and northeastern Oklahoma in the United States. Via the Arkansas, it is part of the Mississippi River watershed.

Course
The Verdigris is formed near Madison, Kansas, by the convergence of two short headwaters streams, its North and South forks, and flows generally southward throughout its course.  South of Coffeyville, Kansas, the river enters Oklahoma.  It joins the Arkansas River near Muskogee, Oklahoma, about a mile upstream of the mouth of the Neosho River. The area of convergence of the three rivers Arkansas, Verdigris and Neosho is called "Three Forks".

History
The river is mentioned in accounts by Zebulon Pike (1806) and Thomas Nuttall (1818). Fur traders had numerous posts along its route where they met with Native Americans to exchange goods for furs.  The river is also mentioned in the novel Little House on the Prairie (1935) by Laura Ingalls Wilder, of her memories when her family moved to Kansas from Wisconsin.

According to the Encyclopædia Britannica, the name may be derived from a greenish substance also called verdigris, resembling a copper ore, which tinged the water. In the U.S. treaty of 1834 with the Cherokee Indians, the river was named as a part of the boundary of their lands in the Indian Territory.

In 1994, Tom Paxton wrote and recorded a song: "Along the Verdigris", celebrating its rural  tranquillity, on his album Wearing The Time.

In July 2007, Coffeyville Resources suffered flooding at its refinery at Coffeyville by the Verdigris River, causing a spill of about 1,700 barrels of crude oil. The company made efforts to ameliorate the damage.

On May 25, 2019, Rogers County sent out a civil authority message to all radios In Washington County, Tulsa County, and other counties about the river rising rapidly.

Dams and transportation
Several dams built by the U.S. Army Corps of Engineers cause the Verdigris to form Toronto Lake near Toronto, Kansas and Oologah Lake near Oologah, Oklahoma. More dams and reservoirs are downstream along the Arkansas River.

From just north of Catoosa, Oklahoma to the river's confluence with the Arkansas, barge traffic is supported on the river via the McClellan-Kerr Navigation System. This consists of a series of locks and dams on the Arkansas and the Verdigris rivers; this system enables commercial navigation between the Tulsa, Oklahoma, area and the Mississippi River, and thence to the Gulf of Mexico.

Tributaries
In Kansas, the Verdigris collects the Fall River at the town of Neodesha and the Elk River at the town of Independence.  In Oklahoma it collects the Caney River in Rogers County.

Cities and towns along the river

Altoona, Kansas
Benedict, Kansas
Catoosa, Oklahoma
Coffeyville, Kansas
Independence, Kansas
Madison, Kansas
Neodesha, Kansas
Okay, Oklahoma
Oologah, Oklahoma
Talala, Oklahoma
Toronto, Kansas
Nowata, Oklahoma
Virgil, Kansas
Verdigris, Oklahoma

Gallery

See also
List of Kansas rivers
List of Oklahoma rivers
Port of Catoosa
Nowata

References

External links

Lowest points of U.S. states
Rivers of Kansas
Rivers of Oklahoma
Tributaries of the Arkansas River
Rivers of Montgomery County, Kansas
Rivers of Greenwood County, Kansas
Rivers of Wilson County, Kansas
Rivers of Wagoner County, Oklahoma
Rivers of Rogers County, Oklahoma
Rivers of Woodson County, Kansas
Rivers of Nowata County, Oklahoma